Warner Music Canada is the Canadian division of Warner Music Group. The label previously operated as WEA Music of Canada, Ltd. (French: WEA Musique du Canada, Ltée), often shortened to WEA Canada, the Canadian subsidiary of WEA International, which later changed its name to Warner Music International in 1990. It was founded in 1967 as Warner Reprise Canada Ltd.

Current artist roster
This list is for artists signed directly to Warner Music Canada.
54-40
Big Wreck
Billy Talent
Blue Rodeo
Brett Kissel
Buck 65
Carys
Corey Hart
Corneille
Courage My Love
Die Mannequin
Divine Brown
Eleven Past One
Great Big Sea
Greg Keelor
Hot Hot Heat
Meaghan Smith
Meghan Patrick
Modern Space
Myles Castello
Scott Helman
Spirit of the West
Sarah Slean
Philip Sayce
The Abrams
The Balconies
The Cliks
The Sheepdogs
The Waking Eyes
The Washboard Union
Tomi Swick

Canadian artists on Warner Music Group affiliates
This list is for Canadian artists currently signed to other Warner Music Group affiliates based outside of Canada.
Michael Bublé (Reprise Records, 143 Records)
Glass Tiger (Halo Entertainment Group and Willow Music) (distributed by Warner)
Scott Helman (Warner Music Canada)
High Valley (Warner Music Nashville)
k.d. lang (Nonesuch Records) (previously on Sire and Warner Bros.)
Robyn Ottolini (Warner Music Nashville)
Daniel Powter (Warner Records)
Rush (Roadrunner Records, previously on Atlantic) (new US LPs imported into Canada under licence)
Simple Plan (Atlantic Records)
Neil Young (Reprise Records)

Canadian artists formerly signed to Warner Music Group
Amanda Stott (Warner Music Canada)
Barenaked Ladies (Reprise)
Bif Naked (Lava/Atlantic [outside Canada]/Warner Music Canada)
Leonard Cohen (Warner Bros.)
Victoria Duffield (Warner Music Canada)
Matthew Good (Warner Music Canada) 
Gowan (Anthem/Atlantic) (outside Canada)
Honeymoon Suite (WEA)
Hot Hot Heat (Sire)
Gordon Lightfoot (Reprise/Warner Bros.)
Lisa Lougheed (WEA)
Alanis Morissette (Maverick/Reprise)
Joni Mitchell (Asylum/Reprise)
Alannah Myles (Atlantic)
One To One (Bonaire/WEA)
Robbie Robertson (Warner Bros.)
Lorraine Segato (WEA)
Tamia (Qwest/Warner Bros./Elektra)
Tegan and Sara (Sire/Warner Records)
The Tragically Hip (Sire) (US)

Affiliated labels
 6ixBuzz Entertainment (2020–present)

References

External links
 Official site

Record labels established in 1967
Canadian record labels
Warner Music labels
IFPI members
1990 in Canadian music
Canadian subsidiaries of foreign companies
1967 establishments in Ontario
Canadian companies established in 1967